Vovkove is a village in Pokrovsk Raion of Donetsk Oblast in Ukraine.

Demographics
Native language as of the Ukrainian Census of 2001:
 Ukrainian 69.57%
 Russian 30.43%

References

Villages in Pokrovsk Raion